Sannō Station is the name of several rail stations in Japan

Sannō Station (Aichi) - in Aichi Prefecture
Sannō Station (Nagano) - a former station in Nagano Prefecture
Sannō Station (Fukui) - in Fukui Prefecture